Dalton is a surname of Norman origin found in Ireland and Britain and places where people from those backgrounds emigrated to. The Hiberno-Norman Dalton sept controlled an area of the Irish midlands following the Norman invasion and assimilation into Ireland. Notable people with the surname include:

A–H
Abby Dalton (1935–2020), American actress
Albert Clayton Dalton (1867–1957), United States military officer
Andy Dalton (American football) (born 1987), American football player
Andy Dalton (rugby union) (born 1951), New Zealand rugby player
Antico Dalton (born 1975), American player of American and Canadian football
Ashley Dalton (elected 2023), British politician
Audrey Dalton (born 1934), Irish actress
Barney Dalton, Australian rugby league player
Brad Dalton (born 1959), Australian basketball player, brother of Mark and Karen Dalton
Brett Dalton (born 1982), American actor
Cal Dalton (1908–1974), American cartoon director
Chuck Dalton (1927–2013), Canadian basketball player
Clifford Dalton, New Zealand nuclear scientist
Conrad Dalton, fictional president of the United States in Madam Secretary
Cornelius Neale Dalton (1842–1920), British civil servant and author
Devyn Dalton, American actress and stuntwoman
Dorothy Dalton (1893–1972), American actress
Edward Tuite Dalton (1815 - 1880) British soldier, anthropologist
Emmett Dalton (1861–1937), U.S. outlaw, member of the Dalton Gang
Eric Dalton (1906–1981), South African cricketer
Festus Dalton, ring name of Drew Hankinson (born 1983), American professional wrestler
Harry Dalton (1928–2005), American baseball executive
Hayden Dalton (born 1996), American basketball player for Hapoel Holon of the Israeli Basketball Premier League
Henry Dalton (born 1847), American physician
Henry Dalton (police officer) (1891–1966), British policeman
Howard Dalton, British microbiologist
Hugh Dalton, Baron Dalton (1887–1962), British politician

I–L
Irene Dalton (1901–1934), American actress
J. Frank Dalton (1848–1951), American alleged outlaw
Jalen Dalton (born 1997), American football player
James Dalton (disambiguation), several people, including:
James Dalton (criminal) (died 1730), British street robber
James Dalton II, a United States Army general killed in the Philippines during World War II
James Langley Dalton (1833–1887), English soldier
Jesse Dalton, ring name of Ray Gordy (born 1979), American professional wrestler
John Dalton (1766–1844), British physicist and chemist
John Dalton (musician) (born 1943), British bass guitarist
John Call Dalton (1825–1889), American physiologist
John Howard Dalton (born 1941), American administrator and banker
John M. Dalton (1900–1972), American politician (Missouri)
John N. Dalton (1931–1986), American politician (Virginia)
John Neale Dalton (1839–1931), British cleric
Jon Dalton (born 1974), U.S. wrestler ("Jonny Fairplay")
Karen Dalton (basketball), (born 1961), Australian basketball player, sister of Brad and Mark Dalton
Karen Dalton (entertainer) (1938–1993), American musician
Katharina Dalton (1916–2004), British physician
Kerry Lyn Dalton (born 1960), American convicted criminal
Kristen Dalton (actress) (born 1966), American actress
Kristen Dalton (Miss USA) (born 1986), Miss USA 2009
Lacy J. Dalton (born 1948), American singer and songwriter
Lawrence Dalton (died 1561), English officer of arms
Lional Dalton (born 1975), American football player
Lucinda Lee Dalton (1847–1925), American Mormon feminist, poet and suffragist

M–Z
Mark Dalton (basketball), Australian basketball player, brother of Brad and Karen Dalton
Matt Jimmy Dalton (1963–2016, English rugby league footballer, Whitehaven R.L.F.C. immortal
Reg Dalton (1896–1979), English footballer
Richard Dalton (disambiguation), several people
Rick Dalton, fictional actor played by Leonardo DiCaprio in Once Upon a Time in Hollywood
Roque Dalton (1935–1975), Salvadoran poet and journalist
Shane Dalton (born 1965), Dublin GAA Inter County hurler and footballer
Stephen Dalton, British air marshal
Theodore Roosevelt Dalton (1901–1989) American lawyer, judge and politician
Tim Dalton, Irish footballer
Timothy Dalton (born 1946), British actor
Tony Dalton (born  1975), Mexican actor
Trent Dalton, Australian journalist and author
Tristram Dalton (1738–1817), American politician
Walter H. Dalton (born 1949), American politician
William Dalton (author) (1821-1875), British newspaper editor and author of adventure stories

See also

Danton (name)

English-language surnames
Surnames of English origin
English toponymic surnames